Pei Jianzhang (born 1927) is a Chinese retired diplomat. He was born in Rizhao, Shandong.

He joined the Chinese Communist Party in 1945. He was acting chargé d'affaires for China in the United Kingdom (1971). He served as the first Chinese ambassador to New Zealand (1973–1979) and concurrently to Papua New Guinea (1977–1979). He was the Chinese ambassador to Libya from 1979 to 1983.

References

External links
http://www.chinaembassy.org.nz/eng/xxl/lstp/t58260.htm 
http://www.fmprc.gov.cn/mfa_eng/ziliao_665539/wjrw_665549/3607_665555/3613_665567/t25383.shtml

Ambassadors of China to Papua New Guinea
Ambassadors of China to New Zealand
Ambassadors of China to Libya
1927 births
Possibly living people
People from Rizhao
Chinese expatriates in the United Kingdom